Burns Garden is a public park in Karachi, Pakistan, situated on Dr Ziauddin Ahmed Road. It houses the National Museum of Pakistan.

History
Burns Garden was founded in 1927. It is named for a physician frequently referred to as Dr Burns, and is possibly James Burnes.

See also
List of parks and gardens in Karachi

References 

Parks in Karachi
1927 establishments in British India